"I'm in Love Again" is a 1956 single by Fats Domino. The song was written by Domino and his longtime collaborator, Dave Bartholomew. The single was Domino's fifth number one on the R&B Best Sellers list, where it stayed at the top for seven weeks.  "I'm in Love Again" also peaked at number three for two weeks on the pop chart.  "I'm in Love Again" was a double-sided hit for Domino as the B-side of the pop standard, "My Blue Heaven".

Other versions

Alma Cogan covered the song in the UK in 1956 without chart success.
Ricky Nelson on his 1958 album 'Ricky Nelson' Imperial LP 9050 USA. 
Bill Haley and His Comets covered this song on their 1960 covers album Bill Haley and His Comets. 
Pat Boone included the song on his album Pat (1957).
The Animals’ US debut album The Animals, MGM Records (SE 4264), and their UK debut album also called The Animals (Columbia (EMI) 33SX 1669), mistakenly listed their cover of Jimmy Reed’s “In the Morning” as this song, crediting it to Domino and Bartholomew.
Paul McCartney recorded the song during his CHOBA B CCCP album sessions. It was released as a B-side for "This One" single and on 1991 international edition of CHOBA B CCCP.
In 2007, Bonnie Raitt and Jon Cleary sang a medley of "I'm in Love Again" and "All by Myself" on the album Goin' Home: A Tribute to Fats Domino.
In 2008, Klaus Voormann was joined by Paul McCartney and Ringo Starr as they covered the song for Voormann's solo album A Sideman's Journey and the associated DVD.

References

Fats Domino songs
1956 singles
Songs written by Dave Bartholomew
The Fontane Sisters songs
The Animals songs
1956 songs
Songs written by Fats Domino